Cras or CRAS may refer to:

People with the surname
 Hendrik Constantijn Cras (1739–1820), Dutch jurist and city librarian of Amsterdam
 Hervé Cras (1910–1980), French military and naval historian
 Jean Cras (1879–1932), French composer and marine officer
 Steff Cras (born 1996), Belgian cyclist

Places
Several places in France:
 Cras (Besançon), a district
 Cras, Isère, a commune
 Cras, Lot, a commune
 Cras-sur-Reyssouze, a commune in the Ain department

Other uses
 Cras navigation plotter, named after its inventor, Jean Cras (see above)
 Club de Radio Aficionados de El Salvador, an amateur radio organization
 Comptes rendus de l'Académie des Sciences, a French scientific journal

See also
 CRA (disambiguation)